El Cristo is a town and corregimiento in Aguadulce District, Coclé Province, Panama. Its population as of 1990 was 3,393; its population as of 2000 was 3,852.

El Cristo is one of the oldest towns in the region. In pre-Columbian times it was inhabited by an aboriginal community for a period of several centuries. According to studies by the archaeologist Cook, this community is similar to the pre-Columbian site of the Sierra at the edge of Santa Maria. The history of El Cristo goes back to the founding of Nata, by which time El Cristo was a cattle farm of the Spanish. The town is home to a Christmas tree, renowned for being the highest in Central America.

References

Corregimientos of Coclé Province